Friant can mean either

Louis Friant, French general during the Napoleonic Wars
Friant, California, a town in the United States